Romualdia opharina is a moth in the family Erebidae first described by William Schaus in 1921. It is found in Brazil.

References

Phaegopterina
Moths described in 1921